Manifiesto may refer to:

Manifiesto (Nepal album)
Manifiesto (Víctor Jara album)